Brunei and Oman established diplomatic relations in 1984. Brunei has an embassy in Muscat, and Oman has an embassy in Bandar Seri Begawan.

History 
Relations have been established since 24 March 1984 with both countries former protectorates of European powers, such as the British for Brunei and the Portuguese for Oman, and both are now governed by an Islamic absolute monarchy.

Economic relations 
Several memorandum of understanding has been signed between the two countries such as agreement between the Universiti Brunei Darussalam with the Sultan Qaboos University in education sector and the establishment of Omani-Brunei Investment Company. There is also a co-operation in telecommunications between Telekom Brunei and Bahwan CyberTek with a joint-venture between the two companies.

References 

Oman
Bilateral relations of Oman